is a Japanese individual and synchronised trampoline gymnast, representing her nation at international competitions.

She competed at world championships, including at the 2011, 2013 and 2015 Trampoline World Championships. She was employed by the Mitsubishi Electric on 1 April 2017.

Results 
 August 2010: the 1st Youth Olympic Games, Individual 3rd place 
 September 2013: World Cup Spain Tournament,  Synchro 1st place
 November 2015: 32nd World Trampoline Championships Tournament, Individual 24th, Synchro 3rd place
 June 2016: World Cup Swiss Tournament, Individual 6th
 November 2016: the All Japan Trampoline Championships,  Individual 1st, Synchro 1st (4th consecutive year)
 April 2018: Canada Cup 2018, Synchro 1st, Individual 6th

References

External links
 
 USA Gymnastics 2010 Youth Olympic Games in Singapore
 Chisato Doihata at Getty Images 
  

1994 births
Living people
Japanese female trampolinists
Place of birth missing (living people)
Gymnasts at the 2010 Summer Youth Olympics
Mitsubishi Electric people
21st-century Japanese women